Ahmad Shah Ramazan is an ethnic Hazara politician from Afghanistan. He was the representative of the people of Balkh Province during the sixteenth parliamentary term of Afghanistan Parliament who elected in 2010.

Early life 
Ahmad Shah Ramazan, son of Ramazan, was born on 1969 in Balkh province of Afghanistan in a family of the Hazara ethnic group. He completed his schooling in the Balkh Province and earned his bachelor's degree in Engineering from Tashkent University of Uzbekistan. after graduation he has had more business activities.

Ramazan is fluent in Dari-Persian, Russian, Uzbek, and a little Pashto and English.

See also 
 List of Hazara people

Notes 

Living people
1969 births
Hazara politicians
Members of the House of the People (Afghanistan)